Dhanbad is the second-most populated city in the Indian state of Jharkhand after Jamshedpur. It ranks as the 42nd largest city in India and is the 33rd largest million-plus urban agglomeration in India. Dhanbad shares its land borders with Paschim Bardhaman district and Purulia district of West Bengal and Bokaro, Giridih and Jamtara districts of Jharkhand. The city is called the 'Coal Capital of India' for housing one of the largest coal mines of India. The prestigious institute, Indian School of Mines (now IIT Dhanbad) is situated in Dhanbad. Apart from coal, it has also grown in information technology.

Dhanbad is the 96th fastest growing city of the world by the City Mayors Foundation. It is the 56th cleanest city of India, according to the 2019 Swachh Survekshan cleanliness survey. It showed a great change in the city which was considered the dirtiest city in the 2018 Swachh Survekshan. Dhanbad Municipal Corporation works for increasing green cover in the city. Among the rail divisions of Indian Railway, Dhanbad Rail Division is the second-largest in revenue generation after the Mumbai division. Dhanbad ranked as the top city in India with the highest 4G mobile phone network availability in India by a survey of Opensignal.

History 

The present district used to be a part of Manbhum region and was occupied by Mundari tribals in the wilderness of South undivided Bihar. In the seventh century A.D. some information is available from the account of the travels of Hieun Tsang. These accounts narrate the existence of a powerful kingdom which comprised the district and adjoining areas, ruled by Sasanka. Manbhum was one of the districts of the East India during the British Raj.

The region has thick forests, with rich mineral resources, and had a mixed demographic profile with people from different religious and social groups, including adivasis, particularly the Santals and the Mundas before the city was established. After the Partition of India, the district became a part of Bihar state, and upon re-organization of the Indian states in the mid-1950s, the district became a part of the West Bengal. Purulia district was carved out of the district of Manbhum.

In the Settlement Report for Manbhum (1928) it was stated that no rock inscriptions, copper plates or old coins were discovered and not a single document of copper plate or palm leaf was found, during the Survey and Settlement operations. The oldest authentic documents produced were all on paper and barely even a hundred years old. Dhanbad city was in Manbhum district from 1928 up to 1956. However, on 24 October 1956, Dhanbad district was carved out of Manbhum district with Dhanbad as District headquarter on the recommendation of the States Reorganization Commission vide notification 1911.

This was done under the commitment and leadership of journalist, Satish Chandra. In the year 2006, Dhanbad celebrated 50 years of being an independent district and city. From 1956 to 14 November 2000, it was under Bihar. At present, it is in Jharkhand, after the creation of the state on 15 November 2000. The discovery of rich deposits of coal in the region caused the city to flourish financially, but also bought notorious coal-mafia and gang wars which continues to this day with areas of city like Wasseypur being most affected by the conflict.

Geography

It shares its boundaries with West Bengal in the eastern and southern part, Dumka and Giridih in the North and Bokaro District in the west. Dhanbad comes under the Chota Nagpur Plateau.

Rivers and Lakes 
The Damodar is a major river of the Chota Nagpur Plateau.  It rises in Palamu and flows eastward between the plateaus of Ranchi and Hazaribag.  It is joined by the Bokaro, the Konar and the Barakar rivers. The Damodar enters Dhanbad district at its confluence with the Jamuria, a stream which marks the western boundary of Dhanbad with Hazaribagh District.  Further east, the Damodar is joined by the Katri River which rises in the foothills below Parasnath and traverses through the coal-field area. The Barakar, which forms the northern boundary of the district, traverses about 77 km. It flows in south westerly direction up to Durgapur and then south till it joins the Damodar near Chirkunda.

Climate

Dhanbad features a climate that is transitional between a humid subtropical climate (Köppen: Cwa) and a tropical wet and dry climate (Aw). Summer starts from the last week of March and ends in mid-June. The peak temperature in summer can reach 48 °C. Dhanbad also receives heavy rainfall. In winter, the minimum temperature remains around 10 °C with a maximum of 22 °C.

Demographics

Population 

 census, Dhanbad City had a population of 1,162,472. Males (614,722) constitute 53% of the population and females (547,750) 47%. It has a sex ratio of 891. Dhanbad has an average literacy rate of 79.47%, higher than the national average of 74.04%: male literacy is 86.14% and female literacy is 71.96%. 10.57% of the population is under 5 years of age.

Religion

Hinduism is the dominant religion with over 81% adherents. The minority religions are Islam, Sikhism and Christianity.

Economy 

Dhanbad has one of the oldest and largest markets in the region and is also a centre of large scale industries. It is known for its coal mines and industrial establishments; the city is surrounded by about 112 coal mines with a total production of 27.5 million tonnes and an annual income of 7,000 million rupees through coal business. There are a number of coal washeries there.

Education
Dhanbad is a leading center of education in eastern India. The city's education system is followed as of the Indian Education System. Schooling is followed by 10+2+3 plan. Most of the schools in Dhanbad are of CBSE, ICSE and state board. The medium of instruction in schools are Hindi, Santali and Urdu and as well as Bengali and Kurmali. Popular schools in Dhanbad includes the Carmel School Digwadih, DAV Public School, Delhi Public School, De Nobili School Bhuli, De Nobili School CMRI, De Nobili School FRI, Jawahar Navodaya Vidyalaya and Tata D.A.V School.

Binod Bihari Mahto Koyalanchal University is the public university of Dhanbad to which many colleges of the region are affiliated. There are various engineering, medical and arts colleges in Dhanbad. Dhanbad is home to some of the leading engineering colleges of India —the  Indian Institute of Technology, Birsa Institute of Technology and K. K. College of Engineering and Management. The Indian Institute of Technology (formerly Indian School of Mines), was established by the British in 1926. It is a premier engineering college of India. Birsa Institute of Technology in Sindri is one of the oldest government engineering college in India.

SSLNT Women's College is one of the oldest women's science and art college in east India established in 1956. Raja Shiva Prasad College was established in 1949 by Raja of Jharia. The Patliputra Medical College and Hospital, established in 1971 is a premier medical college where applicants write the NEET exam to get enrolled. Other major institutions includes Law College, Guru Nanak College, P.K. Roy Memorial College, Bholaram Shibal Kharkia College, B.S.S Mahila College and Al Iqra Teacher's Training College.

Politics
Dhanbad city and district is considered a BJP stronghold with majority of its MPs MLA's being of the party since the 1990s. Chandra Shekhar Agrawal of BJP is the mayor, otherwise known as the first citizen, of Dhanbad Municipal Corporation. He won by the margin of 42,525 votes.

Raj Sinha of Bharatiya Janata Party (BJP) won in the 40-Dhanbad assembly constituency defeating Mannan Malick of the Indian National Congress in 2014. Pashupati Nath Singh of BJP defeated Mannan Mallik of Congress in 2005,  Prasadi Sao of RJD in 2000, and Ramadhar Yadav of JD in 1995. Surendra Prasad Roy of Congress defeated S.K. Shriva of JD in 1990 and Ram Chander Singh of Janata Party in 1985. Yogeshwar Prasad Yogesh of Congress defeated Gopi Kant Bakshi of CPI(M) in 1980 and Kalawati Devi of Janata Party.

Dhanbad assembly constituency is part of Dhanbad (Lok Sabha constituency).

Members of Parliament for Dhanbad

Transport

Rail

 
Dhanbad has a very good rail connectivity with the other major parts of the country such as Delhi, Mumbai, Patna, Kolkata, Bhagalpur, Munger, Gaya, Chennai, Ahmedabad, Hyderabad, Kochi, Indore, Bhopal, Gwalior, Jabalpur, Jaipur, Visakhapatnam Jodhpur, Nagpur, Pune, Varanasi, Guwahati and Bangalore etc. Dhanbad railway division is the second largest revenue generator in India after Mumbai Rail Division. Dhanbad Rail Division comes under East Central Railway zone. Grand Chord rail-line passes through Dhanbad junction, it connects Howrah and New Delhi. CIC rail line starts from Dhanbad and ends at Singrauli in Madhya Pradesh. There is one more rail line passing through the district, it starts at Kharagpur and ends at Gomoh, this rail line comes under South Eastern Railway. Dhanbad is connected with almost all states through rail network. Each and every train through this has a stop at Dhanbad. Even Sealdah Duronto has a stoppage at Dhanbad.

On 1 October 2011, India's first AC double-decker train  was flagged off to connect Howrah and Dhanbad. With this India joins the league of Europe and North America that run multi-deck trains. As of October 2011, the train runs daily except Sunday, departing from Howrah at 8:30 am to arrive at Dhanbad at 12:45 pm, and on return trip it departs Dhanbad at 6:30 pm to arrive at Howrah at 10:40 pm. It has a maximum permissible speed of /hr with stops at Bardhaman, Durgapur, Asansol, Barakar and Kumardhubi on both legs of the route. This new AC design has several features namely stainless steel body, high-speed Eurofima design bogies with air springs and other safety-features.

Roads
National Highway 19 and National Highway 18 are the major highways passing through Dhanbad. NH 19 is part of  Golden Quadrilateral (GQ) highway network; Dhanbad lies in Kolkata-Delhi link of the Golden Quadrilateral network. NH19 is being converted into six lane expressway; NH 18 connects Dhanbad to Bokaro-Jamshedpur.

National Highway 2 also emerges as a connector and transport system for various purpose connecting Delhi with Kolkata

Private and State buses are available for inter-city traveling.

Air
 
Dhanbad Airport is used for private small aircraft and helicopters, currently there is no public air-link at the airport. The nearest public airports to Dhanbad are
Kazi Nazrul Islam Airport, Asansol-Durgapur  
Deoghar Airport, Jharkhand 128 kilometres (79.5 mi) 
Birsa Munda Airport, Ranchi  
Gaya Airport 
Netaji Subhas Chandra Bose International Airport, Kolkata 
Lok Nayak Jayaprakash Airport, Patna

Sports 

Cricket is the most popular sport in Dhanbad, followed by Football. Dhanbad is one of the centres where 34th National Games was organised. Cricket Stadiums at present are at Tata Steel Stadium Digwadih, Nehru Stadium Jealgora and Railway Stadium where Ranji Trophy matches are organised. Women's International Cricket were also played at Railway Stadium. Football matches of national level were played at Railway Stadium but now it is converted into Cricket Stadium by the Railway management. Dhanbad officially became the second town in the state to boast a cricket stadium with floodlights, with the inauguration of floodlights at Tata Digwadih Stadium.

Media

Hindi newspapers are mainly published from the city, among them Hindustan Dainik is the most popular, followed by Prabhat Khabar, Dainik Jagran and Dainik Bhaskar. "Dhanbad Bokaro Live" is published from Dhanbad.

Doordarshan relay station is present in Dhanbad near Koyla Nagar. There are some local news channels in the city such as, Antarkatha which are creative media houses which broadcast on local cable on Dhanbad, Jharia, Bokaro, Chatra, Hazaribag, Koderma, Ramgarh etc.

FM radio is available as Vividh Bharti Service of All India Radio at 101.8 MHz.

Notable people
 

 Bibhu Bhattacharya, Bengali film & TV actor
 P. C. Bose, freedom fighter, labour activist & politician
 Meiyang Chang, Bollywood film & TV actor
 Purushottam K. Chauhan - freedom fighter, labour activist & politician, coal miner
 Seth Khora Ramji Chawda, railway contractor, coal mines owner, banker and philanthropist
 Anurag Dikshit – businessman (ranked 207th-richest person in the world by Forbes in 2006)
 Satya Narayan Gourisaria, British company secretary, Gandhian and a former secretary of the India League
 Subodh Kumar Jaiswal, IPS officer, current CBI director
 Chetan Joshi, classical Indian flautist
 Rishabh Kashyap, Bhojpuri Actor
 Shiv Khera, author and professional speaker
 Binod Bihari Mahato, politician, advocate, activist, founder of Shivaji Samaj and Jharkhand Mukti Morch
 Aseem Mishra, Indian cinematographer
 Zeishan Quadri, Bollywood actor, film maker
 A. K. Roy, founder of Marxist Coordination Committee
 Meenakshi Seshadri, former Bollywood actress
 Deven Sharma, former global president of Standard & Poor's
 Ram Krishna Singh, reviewer, critic, contemporary poet and retired professor of IIT-D
 Diwan Bahadur D.D. Thacker, noted coal miner and philanthropist, owner of Pure Jharia Colliery
 Randhir Prasad Verma, IPS officer and recipient of Ashoka Chakra
 Shahbaz Nadeem, emerging indian cricketer

References

External links 

 Website of the city of Dhanbad

 
Metropolitan cities in India
Dhanbad district
Mining communities in Jharkhand